Kanhar may refer to:
kanhar, Gujarat a place off sutrapada farming area. 
Kanhar, Iran, a village in Kermanshah Province, Iran
Kanhar River, in India